Turbinaria peltata, commonly known as disc coral,  is a species of colonial stony coral in the family Dendrophylliidae. It is native to the Indo-Pacific region. The International Union for Conservation of Nature has rated its conservation status as being "vulnerable".

Description
Turbinaria peltata may be foliaceous or encrusting, and tends to form thick, flat plates, often in overlapping tiers. The colonies may be several metres in diameter. On the upper surfaces of larger colonies, two-sided ridges or cylindrical columns may form. The septa are arranged in three cycles, the third one often being reduced or absent. The septa are granulated and the columella is domed and spongy, or alternatively, has a central plate. The polyps of this species are often extended to feed during the daytime. This coral is usually some shade of grey or brown. It is a zooxanthellate coral that houses symbiont dinoflagellates in its tissues.

Distribution and habitat
Turbinaria peltata is native to the warm waters of the Indo-Pacific region. Its range extends from the coast of East Africa to Taiwan and American Samoa. It is common in most shallow water habitats such as rocky foreshores and shallow reef slopes, especially in areas of turbid water.

Biology
Colonies of Turbinaria peltata grow by extra-tentacular budding. This means that new corallites grow between existing ones, outside the corallite walls. The new corallites tend to be small and make the surface appear more crowded.

Conservation status
The International Union for Conservation of Nature has assessed the conservation status of Turbinaria peltata as being "vulnerable". Although it is a common species with a widespread distribution, it faces a number of threats. It is collected for the aquarium trade, rising sea water temperatures and ocean acidification cause stressful conditions and make it more susceptible to coral bleaching and coral diseases. Localised threats include fisheries, damage to reefs, tourism, pollution and sedimentation.

References

External links
 
 

Dendrophylliidae
Corals described in 1794